Amblyseius bidibidi is a species of mite in the family Phytoseiidae.

References

bidibidi
Articles created by Qbugbot
Animals described in 1964